San Rafael is a small town located about 15 minutes southeast of Guasave, Sinaloa, Mexico. The small town was flooded (around the year 1987 according to a local) because of a broken dike. The government helped the city rebuild.

Populated places in Sinaloa